Guns and Roses Volume. 1 is the debut mixtape by grime crew Ruff Sqwad. It was released in March 2005 on the independent record label Ruff Sqwad Recordings. It is considered to be one of the best mixtapes to come from the grime scene. The album is the first of a three-part album series.

Track listing

All Lyrics are by the five members of Ruff Sqwad: Tinchy Stryder, Dirty Danger, Slix, Rapid, Shifty Rydos and frequent collaborator, Mad Max.
 All 23 tracks are produced by Ruff Sqwad members: Prince Rapid & David "Dirty Danger" Nkrumah

References

External links
 Ruff Sqwad - Guns and Roses. Pitchfork Media, www.pitchfork.com.
 Review: Ruff Sqwad ‘Guns & Roses Vol. 1. Riddim.ca.
 Ruff Sqwad - Guns And Roses Volume 1. Grimepedia.

2005 debut albums
Ruff Sqwad albums
Self-released albums